Tibiofibular joint may refer to:
 Superior tibiofibular joint
 Inferior tibiofibular joint